Fujiwara no Taishi may refer to either of the following Japanese noblewomen:

Fujiwara no Taishi (died 794), wife of Prince Ate, who became Emperor Heizei after her death
Fujiwara no Taishi (died 1155), wife of Emperor Toba